Mount Scott is located on the border of Alberta and British Columbia, North of the Hooker Icefield in Hamber Provincial Park. It is Alberta's 44th highest peak, and Alberta's 46th most prominence mountain. It is also British Columbia's 57th highest peak. It was named in 1913 after Captain Robert Falcon Scott.

See also
 List of peaks on the British Columbia–Alberta border
 List of mountains in the Canadian Rockies

References

Three-thousanders of Alberta
Three-thousanders of British Columbia
Canadian Rockies